The UK Singles Chart is one of many music charts compiled by the Official Charts Company that calculates the best-selling singles of the week in the United Kingdom. Before 2004, the chart was only based on the sales of physical singles. This list shows singles that peaked in the Top 10 of the UK Singles Chart during 1975, as well as singles which peaked in 1974 but were in the top 10 in 1975. The entry date is when the single appeared in the top 10 for the first time (week ending, as published by the Official Charts Company, which is six days after the chart is announced).

One-hundred and forty-seven singles were in the top ten in 1975. Nine singles from 1974 remained in the top 10 for several weeks at the beginning of the year. "My Boy" by Elvis Presley, "Streets of London" by Ralph McTell and "Wombling Merry Christmas" by The Wombles were the singles from 1974 to reach their peak in 1975. Twenty-six artists scored multiple entries in the top 10 in 1975. Demis Roussos, Gladys Knight & The Pips, Gloria Gaynor, Guys 'n' Dolls and Tammy Wynette were among the many artists who achieved their first UK charting top 10 single in 1975.

The 1974 Christmas number-one, "Lonely This Christmas" by Mud, remained at number-one for the first two weeks of 1975. The first new number-one single of the year was "Down Down" by Status Quo. Overall, twenty-one different singles peaked at number-one in 1975, with The Bay City Rollers (2) having the most singles hit that position.

Background

Multiple entries
One-hundred and forty-seven singles charted in the top 10 in 1975, with one-hundred and forty-one singles reaching their peak that year. "Paloma Blanca" was recorded by Jonathan King (as "Una Paloma Blanca (White Dove)") and George Baker Selection and both versions reached the top 10.

Twenty-six artists scored multiple entries in the top 10 in 1975. Rock band Mud  secured the record for most top 10 hits, with six singles. This included two number-one singles: their Christmas number-one from 1974, "Lonely This Christmas" spent two additional weeks at the top of the chart in early January, while "Oh Boy!" scaled the chart in April. Their other song that reached the top five was "The Secrets That You Keep" in February. Of their three final entries, "Show Me You're a Woman" peaked highest at number eight in December; earlier in the year, "Moonshine Sally" (July) and "L-L-Lucy" (October) both sneaked into the top 10 at number ten.

Six artists shared the accolade for second most top ten entries this year. This included three British performers and three musical acts from the United States. The Bay City Rollers spent a total of nineteen weeks in the top 10 in 1975 with their three singles, with two of their singles reaching number-one. "Bye Bye Baby" was the most successful of these, becoming the biggest selling single of the year in the UK and topped the chart for six weeks. "Give a Little Love" also reached the summit in July. Their haul was completed by November's number three smash "Money Honey".

Frankie Valli of The Four Season numbered one solo single and two singles with the group among his three top 10 hits. "My Eyes Adored You" (initially intended as a single for the band) landed him a solo top five spot, while "The Night" peaked at number seven and "Who Loves You" went in one place higher. Soul group The Stylistics were the final act originating from America to make the top 10 on three occasions in 1975. "Sing Baby Sing" began their run in May, "Can't Give You Anything (But My Love)" topped the chart in August and was the third best-selling single of the year, and "Na Na Is the Saddest Word" made number five just before Christmas.

British singer David Essex had three top 10 hits, the best performing "Hold Me Close" going to number-one in September. "Stardust" had peaked at number seven at the start of the year and "Rolling Stone" was a top five entry in July. Glam rock band Kenny matched this feat with three singles nestling inside the top 10. "The Bump" made number three in January, "Fancy Pants" was at number four in March and "Julie Anne" rounded it off at number ten in September. The final singer to meet the three single total was Englishman Gary Glitter, which included "Oh Yes! You're Beautiful" from the tail-end of 1974 at number two. "Doing Alright with the Boys" rose to number six in June and "Love Like You and Me" reached number ten a few months earlier.

David Bowie was one of a number of artists with two top-ten entries, including the number-one single "Space Oddity". Barry White, Elvis Presley, Hot Chocolate, Rod Stewart and Status Quo were among the other artists who had multiple top 10 entries in 1975.

Chart debuts
Fifty-eight artists achieved their first top 10 single in 1975, either as a lead or featured artist. Of these, five went on to record another hit single that year: Gladys Knight & The Pips, The Goodies, Mac and Katie Kissoon, Moments and Smokie. Kenny had two other entries in their breakthrough year.

The following table (collapsed on desktop site) does not include acts who had previously charted as part of a group and secured their first top 10 solo single.

Notes
Frankie Valli had been a part of the group The Four Seasons  since 1962, when they had taken their debut single "Sherry" to number eight . He recorded "My Eyes Adored You" - originally intended as a Four Seasons release - on his own, peaking at number five in March 1975.

Mike Batt performed as a vocalist (as well as producer) with The Wombles, who debuted in 1974 with four hit singles including Christmas song "Wombling Merry Christmas". He had a solo top 10 single with "Summertime City" in 1975. Art Garfunkel appeared in the chart for the first time in 1975 without his singing partner Paul Simon, topping the chart with "I Only Have Eyes for You". John Lennon was a highly successful musician in the line-up of The Beatles, as well as with his wife Yoko Ono and the Plastic Ono Band prior to 1975, when he released his top 10 debut single "Imagine", which peaked at number six that year, and later reached number-one following his assassination in December 1980.

Songs from films
The only modern song from a film to enter the top 10 in 1975 was "Sky High" (from The Man from Hong Kong). 'The Trail of The Lonesome Pine' by Laurel and Hardy was from the 1937 film 'Way Out west'.

Best-selling singles
The Bay City Rollers had the best-selling single of the year with "Bye Bye Baby". The single spent ten weeks in the top 10 (including six weeks at number one) and was certified gold by the BPI. "Sailing" by Rod Stewart came in second place. The Stylistics' "Can't Give You Anything (But My Love)", "Whispering Grass" from Windsor Davies & Don Estelle and "Stand by Your Man" by Tammy Wynette made up the top five. Singles by The Bay City Rollers ("Give a Little Love"), David Essex, Roger Whittaker, Art Garfunkel and Johnny Nash were also in the top ten best-selling singles of the year.

Top-ten singles
Key

Entries by artist

The following table shows artists who achieved two or more top 10 entries in 1975, including singles that reached their peak in 1974. The figures include both main artists and featured artists, while appearances on ensemble charity records are also counted for each artist. The total number of weeks an artist spent in the top ten in 1975 is also shown.

Notes

 "Get Dancin'" re-entered the top 10 at number 8 on 11 January 1975 (week ending).
 "My Eyes Adored You" was originally going to be released by The Four Seasons but the recording was sold to lead singer Frankie Valli who released it as a solo artist.
 "Honey" originally peaked at number 2 upon its initial release in 1968.
 "The Night" was credited to Frankie Valli and The Four Seasons while "Who Loves You" is noted under The Four Seasons name (whose line-up included Frankie Valli).
 "I Wanna Dance Wit Choo" re-entered the top 10 at number 8 on 31 May 1975 (week ending).
 "The Israelites" originally peaked at number 1 upon its initial release in 1969.
 "Have You Seen Her" originally peaked at number 3 upon its initial release in 1972, while "Oh Girl" originally peaked outside the top 10 at number 14 on its initial release that same year. In 1975, the two songs were re-issued together as a double A-sided single.
 "Sealed With a Kiss" originally peaked at number 3 upon its initial release in 1962.
 Mike Batt had one solo top ten single in 1975, "Summertime City", but he was also a producer and vocalist on The Wombles song "Wombling Merry Christmas".
 "Space Oddity" originally peaked at number 5 upon its initial release in 1969.
 "Let's Twist Again" originally peaked at number 2 upon its initial release in 1962. "The Twist" originally peaked outside the top 10 at number 49 on its initial release in 1960. It reached the top 20 for the first time in 1962, peaking at number 14. In 1975, the two songs were re-issued together as a double A-sided single.
 "Happy to Be On An Island in the Sun" re-entered the top 10 at number 10 on 17 January 1976 (week ending).
 Figure includes song that peaked in 1974.
 Figure includes a top 10 hit with the group The Four Seasons.
 Figure includes song that first charted in 1974 but peaked in 1975.
 Figure includes a top 10 hit with the group The Wombles.

See also
1975 in British music
List of number-one singles from the 1970s (UK)

References
General

Specific

External links
1975 singles chart archive at the Official Charts Company (click on relevant week)

Top 10 singles
United Kingdom
1975